William Bray was an Australian rugby league footballer in what was New South Wales' major rugby league competition at the time, the New South Wales Rugby Football League premiership. He played 26 matches, all for the Eastern Suburbs club in the years 1946–1948, scoring four tries in 1947.

References

Australian rugby league players
Sydney Roosters players
Living people
Year of birth missing (living people)
Rugby league props
Place of birth missing (living people)